Admiral Arun Prakash, PVSM, AVSM, VrC, VSM (born October 1944) is a former Flag Officer of the Indian Navy. He served as the Chief of the Naval Staff from 31 July 2004 to 31 October 2006 and as the Chairman of the Chiefs of Staff Committee from 31 January 2005 to 31 October 2006. He is one of India's most decorated naval officers.

Prakash was born in a military family and raised in Jammu and Kashmir. He joined the National Defence Academy, graduating in 1964. He was commissioned into the Indian Navy in 1966. Trained as a naval aviator, he served on India's first aircraft carrier . During the Indo-Pakistani War of 1971, he was attached with the No. 20 Squadron IAF. He was awarded the Vir Chakra for leading airstrikes deep into enemy territory. 

After the war, in 1976, he attended the Indian Air Force Test Pilot School. He subsequently commanded the Chamak-class missile boat . He also commanded the naval squadron INAS 300 and led its conversion to the Sea Harrier. He then commanded the Leopard-class frigate  which was converted to a training ship. He also commanded the Nilgiri-class frigate . In 1990, he was appointed the third commanding officer of the aircraft carrier . As a Commodore, He also commanded the naval air station INS Hansa in Goa.

Prakash was promoted to Flag rank in 1993 and appointed Assistant Chief of Naval Staff (Air) (ACNS Air). In 1995, he took command of the Eastern Fleet as the 21st Flag Officer Commanding Eastern Fleet (FOCEF). After a two-year stint, he took over as Assistant Chief of Personnel (ACOP). Promoted to Vice Admiral, he served as the Commandant of the National Defence Academy from 1997 to 1999, after which he took over as Chief of Personnel at Naval HQ. In 2001, he was appointed the first Commander-in-Chief of the newly-created Andaman and Nicobar Command. He subsequently had stints as the Flag Officer Commanding-in-Chief Western Naval Command and Vice Chief of the Naval Staff.

On 31 July 2004, Prakash assumed office as the 18th Chief of the Naval Staff. He took over as the Chairman of the Chiefs of Staff Committee on 31 January 2005 from General Nirmal Chander Vij.

Early life and education
Prakash grew up in the Kashmir Valley, where his father rose to be a District Commissioner of Leh. His two elder brothers also joined the Indian Armed Forces, serving in the Indian Army.
He graduated from the National Defence Academy in 1964, Indian Air Force Test Pilot School in 1976, the Defence Services Staff College in 1979, and the U.S. Naval War College in 1990.

Career

Early career
Prakash was commissioned into the Indian Navy as an acting sub-lieutenant on 1 January 1966. He specialised in naval aviation, qualifying as a pilot in the Sea Hawk jet fighter, flying from the deck of the aircraft carrier  in 1968. As a junior officer, he served afloat in Vikrant, and INS Delhi.  His assignments in naval aviation included flying Islander aircraft with Indian Navy Air Squadron 550, Vampire and Kiran aircraft with Indian Navy Air Squadron 551, and Seahawk aircraft with Indian Navy Air Squadron 300.

Indo-Pakistani War of 1971
In the 1971 Indo-Pakistan War, then Lieutenant Prakash flew Hawker Hunter aircraft for the 20th Squadron Lightnings. For his gallantry in air action over West Pakistan and Jammu and Kashmir, he received the Vir Chakra.

The Vir Chakra citation reads:
During the operations against Pakistan in December, 1971, Lieutenant Arun Parkash was a deputation to the Indian Air Force. On the 4th December, 1971, he led an Indian Air Force strikes mission to an enemy airfield. In this mission, he destroyed enemy’s heavy transport on ground and returned to base. On the 5th December, 1971, he led a very deep penetration day operational strike into enemy territory and attacked enemy air-fields heavily defended by air and ground forces. It destroyed enemy’s Heavy Transport Aircraft, attacked troops and supplies and returned to base.
Throughout, Lieutenant Arun Parkash displayed gallantry, leadership and devotion to duty of a high order.

Post-War
Promoted to Lieutenant Commander on 1 May 1976, he flew the Super Constellation that year for maritime air reconnaissance with Indian Navy Air Squadron 312. He later commanded the missile boat INS Chatak, the training frigate , the antisubmarine warfare frigate INS Vindhyagiri, and the aircraft carrier INS Viraat.

He was promoted to Commander on 1 July 1980, and in 1983, while in command of Indian Navy Air Squadron 300, he supervised the training of Indian Navy crew members in the United Kingdom for the Sea Harrier and ferried the newly acquired aircraft back to India. He commanded two Air Squadrons and the naval air station INS Hansa. In his aviation assignments, he logged more than 2,500 hours in the air in single and multi-engined, shore-based and carrier-based aircraft. He was promoted to Captain on 1 July 1986.

Flag Rank
On 4 January 1993, Prakash was promoted to the rank of Rear Admiral and appointed Assistant Chief of Naval Staff (Air) (ACNS Air). On 1 April 1995, after a two-year stint as ACNS, he was appointed the 21st Flag Officer Commanding Eastern Fleet. He was in command of the Eastern Fleet for about a year-and-a-half. In late-1996, he moved to Naval HQ as Assistant Chief of Personnel (ACOP). 

He was then promoted to the rank of Vice Admiral on 31 July 1997, and took over as the Commandant of the National Defence Academy, an appointment he served in till 19 March 1999. He then moved to NHQ, having been appointed Chief of Personnel. In October 2001, he became the first Commander-in-Chief of the newly established Andaman and Nicobar Command. Then, on 31 December 2002, he took over as the Flag Officer Commanding-in-Chief (FOC-in-C) Western Naval Command. Following this assignment, he was appointed as the Vice Chief of Naval Staff, serving for a brief period from October 2003 to July 2004.

Chief of Naval Staff
Prakash was promoted to Full Admiral and was appointed the 20th Chief of Naval Staff on 31 July 2004. With the retirement of General Nirmal Chander Vij, Admiral Prakash took over as the Chairman of the Chiefs of Staff Committee on 31 January 2005. While serving as Chief of Naval Staff, Prakash played an important role in renewing the Indian Navy's relationships with the United States Navy and in developing a vision of India's maritime strategy. Prakash retired as Chief of Naval Staff in October 2006. He retired from the post of Chairman of the Chiefs of Staff Committee at the same time.

Decorations and Medals

Published writings
 From the Crow's Nest: A Compendium of Speeches and Writings on Maritime and Other Issues, New Delhi: Lancer Publishers, 2007.

References

Sources

 Official Biography

1944 births
Living people
People from Anantnag
Indian Navy admirals
Indian naval aviators
Defence Services Staff College alumni
Naval War College alumni
Recipients of the Param Vishisht Seva Medal
Recipients of the Ati Vishisht Seva Medal
Recipients of the Vir Chakra
Recipients of the Vishisht Seva Medal
Flag Officers Commanding Eastern Fleet
Commandants of the National Defence Academy
Chiefs of Personnel (India)
Commanders-in-Chief, Andaman and Nicobar Command
Vice Chiefs of Naval Staff (India)
Chiefs of the Naval Staff (India)